Sergey Zenevich (known until 1999 as Sergey Kozlovskiy; born 23 January 1976) is a Belarusian professional football manager and former player.

Honours

Player
Sheriff Tiraspol
Moldovan Cup: 1998–99

Belshina Bobruisk
Belarusian Premier League: 2001
Belarusian Cup: 2000–01

References

External links

1976 births
Living people
Footballers from Minsk
Belarusian footballers
Association football defenders
Belarusian expatriate footballers
Expatriate footballers in Moldova
Belarusian Premier League players
FC Ataka Minsk players
FC BATE Borisov players
FC Kommunalnik Slonim players
FC Sheriff Tiraspol players
FC Belshina Bobruisk players
FC Torpedo-BelAZ Zhodino players
FC Vitebsk players
FC Darida Minsk Raion players
FC Rudziensk players
FC Rechitsa-2014 players
Belarusian football managers
FC Torpedo Zhodino managers
FC BATE Borisov managers